Maharlika is the warrior feudal class of the ancient Tagalog society in Luzon.

Maharlika may also refer to:

Places
Maharlika Livelihood Center, shopping center in Baguio
Maharlika Village, a barangay of Taguig
Maharlika, a barangay of Quezon City

Sports
Maharlika Pilipinas Basketball League, a professional basketball league
Maharlika Manila F.C., a football club

Other
Maharlika Charity Foundation, an organization based in Davao City
Maharlika Investment Fund, a proposed sovereign wealth fund
Maharlika Nation, self-proclaimed nation based in Socorro, Surigao del Norte
Maharlika (film), 1987 Philippine war film

External links